John Edward James Cronk (10 September 1890 – 26 September 1964) was an Australian rules footballer who played with Richmond in the Victorian Football League (VFL).

Notes

External links 
		

1890 births
1964 deaths
Australian rules footballers from Melbourne
Richmond Football Club players
People from Richmond, Victoria